Daniel Kubeš (born 7 February 1978) is a Czech handball coach for the Czech national team.

References

1978 births
Living people
Czech male handball players
Sportspeople from Prague
Czech handball coaches
Expatriate handball players
Czech expatriate sportspeople in Germany
Czech expatriate sportspeople in Sweden
Handball-Bundesliga players
HSG Nordhorn-Lingen players
THW Kiel players
HK Drott players